Graphoderus bilineatus is a species of beetle in family Dytiscidae. The IUCN Red List reports it from Austria, Belgium, Bosnia and Herzegovina, Croatia, the Czech Republic, Denmark, Finland, France, Germany, Hungary, Italy, Latvia, Lithuania, Luxembourg, the Netherlands, Norway, Poland, Russia, Serbia and Montenegro, Slovakia, Switzerland, Turkmenistan, Ukraine, and the United Kingdom.

References

Dytiscidae
Beetles of Asia
Beetles of Europe
Taxa named by Charles De Geer
Beetles described in 1774
Taxonomy articles created by Polbot